Jean-Baptiste-Alphonse Lusignan (27 September 1843 at Saint-Denis-sur-Richelieu, Quebec – 5 January 1893) was a French-Canadian writer.

Life

His parents were Jean-Baptiste Lusignan, a merchant, and Onésime Masse. He was educated at St-Hyacinthe College and studied theology there and at Montreal Seminary. Judging after three years that he had no vocation for the Catholic Church, he studied law at St-Hyacinthe and at Laval University, Quebec, and practised in the former city for a few years. 

He contributed to several newspapers and was chief editor (1865–68) of Le Pays, the principal organ of the French-Canadian Liberal party at the time. Lusignan published (1872), as a continuation of a similar work by Judge Ramsay, a "Digest of Reported cases"; "Coups d'oeil et coups de plume" (1884). A leading francophone author, he was elected (1885) a member of the Royal Society of Canada.

References

Attribution
 The entry cites:
Maclean Rose, Cyclopedia of Canadian Biography (Toronto, 1886); 
À la memoire d'Alphonse Lusignan (Montreal, 1892)

External links
 University of Laval page

1843 births
1893 deaths
Canadian legal writers